Cheshmeh Sard may refer to:
 Cheshmeh Sard, Isfahan
 Cheshmeh Sard, Lorestan